Tamta Mqargrdzeli (c.1195 - 1254) was an Armenian Chalcedonian Christian noble woman of Kurdish descent, born at the court of queen Tamar of Georgia. She appears in only a few written sources, including contemporary histories by Kirakos Gandzaketsi and Vardan Areveltsi.

Biography

Early life and family 
Mqargrdzeli was the daughter of Ivane Mqargrdzeli, who was a prominent figure in the Kingdom of Georgia. Her brother, Avag Mkhargrdzeli (died 1250 AD) was atabeg and amirspasalar of Georgia during the 13th century. Whilst we do not know either Mqargrdzeli or her parents dates of birth, it has been estimated that she was born c.1195, based on her being at least thirteen years old at the time of her first marriage.

Marriage to the Saladin dynasty 
Mqargrdzeli was surrendered in marriage to al-Awhad, one of Saladin's nephews after her family were captured in 1210. However, al-Awhad died before the marriage proper. She was subsequently married to al-Ashraf of the Ayyubid dynasty for over 25 years, until his death in 1237: she was one of many wives in his hareem.

Capture by the Khwarazmian dynasty 
In 1230 she was raped, captured and married by Jalal al-Din, leader of the Khwarazmian dynasty, after he captured Akhlat.

Capture by the Mongols 
Around 1236 she was captured by the Seljuks and given within a political deal to the Mongols. She subsequently travelled widely with the Mongolian court, including to Mongolia between 1236-1245.

Leadership 
Although Akhlat was administered by a male Muslim governor on behalf of al-Ashraf, according to the Armenian 13th-century historian Kirakos Gandzaketsi, while she was al-Ashraf's wife Tamta influenced decisions including support for pilgrimage and reducing tax rates. Anthony Eastmond suggests that Tamta's status as a Christian helped her to influence the citizens of Akhlat, who remained majority Christian during the Muslim rule.

Mqargrdzeli is recorded as commanding a fort in 1225 on the modern border of Azerbaijan and Armenia, named `Aliabad. In 1244, the Mongol ruler Töregene Khatun reinstated Tamta Mqargrdzeli as a governor in Akhlat.

Historiography 
In Tamta's World, Eastmond uses the few sources that reference life within a wide variety of circumstantial evidence for her life. Zaroui Pogossian takes issue with Eastmon's emphasis of the role and influence of men over Mqargrdzeli's life and argues that female influence on Tamta herself, through her family and the court would have been considerable.

Selected publications 
Sergio La Porta, 'Reconstructing Armenia: Strategies of Co-Existence amongst Christians and Muslims in the Thirteenth Century', in Negotiating Co-Existence: Communities, Cultures and Convivencia in Byzantine Society (2013) gives an account of Tamta's life and family.

Anthony Eastmond, Tamta's World (2017) gives a biography of Tamta. The book received an honourable mention at the Association of American Publishers 2018 PROSE Awards.

References

1254 deaths
Year of birth missing
13th-century women from Georgia (country)
Place of birth missing
Georgian people of Armenian descent